Little Salmon Creek is a westward-flowing stream in Mendocino County, California which empties into Big Salmon Creek near the town of Albion, California.

See also
 List of rivers of California
 Salmon Creek (Sonoma County, California)

References

Rivers of Mendocino County, California
Rivers of Northern California